The 2015 Nigerian Senate election in Benue State was held on March 28, 2015, to elect members of the Nigerian Senate to represent Benue State. Barnabas Andyar Gemade representing Benue North East and George Akume representing Benue North West won on the platform of All Progressives Congress, while David Mark representing Benue South won on the platform of Peoples Democratic Party.

Overview

Summary

Results

Benue North East 
All Progressives Congress candidate Barnabas Andyar Gemade won the election, defeating People's Democratic Party candidate Gabriel Suswam and other party candidates.

Benue North West 
All Progressives Congress candidate George Akume won the election, defeating People's Democratic Party candidate Mike Mku and other party candidates.

Benue South 
Peoples Democratic Party candidate David Mark won the election, defeating All Progressives Congress candidate Daniel Onjeh and other party candidates.

References 

Benue State Senate elections
Senate elections in Benue State
Ben